The Aasee College of Education is a college located in the Karur district of Tamil Nadu in the southern part of India.

The college specializes in awarding Bachelor of Education degrees.  The college was founded in December 2006 by the TKPEC Trust with the goal of increasing the number of quality teachers in India.  The chairmanship of TKPEC Trust is held by Thiru Aasee S. Muthusamy.

See also 
 List of teacher education schools in India

References

External links
 Official website: 

Colleges of education in Tamil Nadu
Karur district
Educational institutions established in 2006
2006 establishments in Tamil Nadu